Rieti is the surname of an ancient Jewish family originated from the city of Rieti, in central Italy; variants of the surname include Rietti, Rietty, Riettis, Arietti and Arieti.
 Gaio Isaac of Rieti, forefather of the family
 Moses ben Isaac of Rieti, also known as Moses Rieti or Mosè di Gaio (1388-1460), son of Gaio Isaac, poet and physician
Rabbi Jonathan Rietti, son of Robert Rietti, an Orthodox rabbi involved in Jewish outreach, living in USA
Robert Rietti (1923–2015), also known as Robert Rietty, a British actor, director, and writer
Victor Rietti (1888–1963), father of Robert, also actor, writer, and violinist
Vittorio Rieti (1898–1994), Italian composer

Surnames